Mouchel Group was an infrastructure and business services company headquartered in Woking, United Kingdom. It provided advisory, design, project delivery and managed services associated with infrastructure and business services across the highways and transportation, local government, emergency services, property, health, education and utility markets across the world.

In June 2015 Mouchel was purchased by Kier Group for £265 million. This included both the Mouchel Infrastructure Services and Mouchel Business Services divisions. Subsequently, Mouchel Infrastructure Services was rebranded as Mouchel Consulting, with the Business Services sector falling under the Kier brand. Grant Rumbles stepped down as CEO with Haydn Mursell, CEO of Kier Group, assuming the role.  Kier sold Mouchel Consulting to WSP Global in October 2016 and the Mouchel name was dropped.

History

Early history
Mouchel was founded in Briton Ferry in 1897 by Louis Gustave Mouchel, who arrived in the UK from France with a licence to use the new technique of reinforcing concrete using iron bars that was developed by François Hennebique.

During the first half of the twentieth century, Mouchel developed into a consulting engineering practice, with early work including the Royal Liver Building in Liverpool, London's Earls Court and Royal Victoria Dock, and football stands for Liverpool Football Club and Manchester City Football Club. The company also designed the cooling towers for London landmark Battersea Power Station.

In the 1980s, with the evolution of privatisation and outsourcing in the UK, Mouchel moved into advising local authorities on competitive tendering. It floated in June 2002.

Expansion

Mouchel plc's acquisitions included signalling and safety consultant Metro Consulting in February 2002, e-government and ICT specialists Lloyd Davies Associates plc in April 2003, and gas engineering consultancy GEL Group Limited in August 2003.

Mouchel plc and Parkman Group plc (founded in 1888) announced plans to merge on 21 August 2003. The merger was completed in September 2003, forming the new company, Mouchel Parkman plc. A single trading company, Mouchel Parkman Services Limited, was created on 1 April 2004.

The first acquisition as a merged company took place in May 2005, when Mouchel Parkman bought mainline engineering and installation specialists ServiRail. The acquisition allowed Mouchel Parkman to move into mainline engineering and installation for the first time.

On 16 November 2006, it announced a trio of acquisitions worth a total value of £50 million – project management and organisational change specialist Hornagold and Hills, water and utilities consultancy Ewan Group plc, and software and system solutions company Traffic Support Limited (TSL). The acquisitions had combined revenues of £30 million and increased the group's staffing by nearly 500.

Its last acquisition under the Mouchel Parkman brand took place on 7 August 2007, when it purchased business process outsourcing (BPO) and IT group HBS, formerly Hyder Business Services, for £46.24 million from private equity firm Terra Firma. The two companies first worked together in May 2007, when they started a £300 million 12-year strategic services partnership with Oldham Metropolitan Borough Council called the Unity Partnership.

On 16 October 2007, Mouchel Parkman rebranded as 'Mouchel', changing its stance from being a 'professional support services group' to a 'consulting and business services group'. The change was designed to be more inclusive of its expanded business outsourcing division, following the purchase of HBS, rather than being a traditional technical and engineering consultancy.

Mouchel's first acquisition as a rebranded company was that of UK public sector management consultant Hedra, for £50 million in March 2008. The purchase added around 200 staff to Mouchel's management consultancy business, as well as two new service areas – 'solutions', such as enterprise content management (ECM), enterprise resource planning (ERP) and electronic document and records management (EDRM), and 'managed services', which involves process and technology services across multi-year service agreement contracts.

In August 2012 Mouchel delisted from the stock exchange and ownership moved to MRBL, a company owned by Barclays Bank, Royal Bank of Scotland, Lloyds Bank and Mouchel's management.  By that point the value of Mouchel shares had fallen to zero. Kier later bought the company and broke it up, selling Mouchel Consulting onto WSP UK.

Operations 
Mouchel provided managerial, commercial and technical expertise to clients in the public sector and regulated industry, and to a lesser extent the private sector. Clients employed Mouchel to assist with strategy, services, and both people and asset management. Operations included highways, water, property, housing, education, management consultancy and 'business process outsourcing' in a wide range of disciplines.

According to New Civil Engineer magazine's Consultants File 2011, Mouchel was then the second largest provider of UK public sector outsourced services and the second largest technical consultant in roads in the UK.

Business process outsourcing

Mouchel's business process outsourcing 2010 - 2014 Manchester operated Citi Bank to Opus Mastercard transfer, business works with local authority clients in the UK to operate back-office support services. Its key partnerships are with Bath & North East Somerset Council, Lincolnshire County Council, Middlesbrough Council, Milton Keynes Council and Oldham Metropolitan Borough Council and Bournemouth Borough Council.

Education

Mouchel's education business provides services for individual schools, groups of schools and local authorities, as well as local authority support for the UK government's 'Every Child Matters' agenda, which seeks to improve the outcomes for children. In October 2007 its 50:50 joint venture with Babcock – mpb education – was named preferred bidder by the London Borough of Hackney to deliver its £167 million Building Schools for the Future (BSF) programme.

Highways

Mouchel's highways business is one of the UK's leading highways companies. Its services range from the planning and design of major capital projects to the maintenance and management of congested road networks; the business manages, maintains and improves more than 60,000 km of motorways and trunk roads throughout the UK. Highways-related work represents a third of the group's turnover.

Housing

Mouchel's housing business was one of the UK's first providers to deliver externalised housing management services. These include rent arrears recovery, repairs management, major works, estates services and the management of supported housing units for the elderly. Its only current contract involves managing council housing stock across eight electoral wards in Hackney, from neighbourhood offices in Homerton and De Beauvoir and Queensbridge, on behalf of Hackney Homes – the company launched and owned by the London Borough of Hackney in April 2006.

International

Mouchel's international business employs around 420 professional staff and is primarily based in the Middle East, with two offices in Dubai and one in both Abu Dhabi and Kuwait. The company also has two offices in Africa; Nairobi and Cape Town. In 2007 it had a turnover of £28 million, the majority of which derived from its work in the United Arab Emirates. Its major clients include Nakheel, Aldar, Dubai Festival City and Dubai Municipality, to which it provides project management, engineering design and landscape design services.  In Australia Mouchel's new highways maintenance joint venture - DownerMouchel - has won three Western Australian highway maintenance contracts worth £138m to Mouchel over five years.

Land and environment

Mouchel's land and environment business provides land remediation, geotechnical engineering and environmental planning.

The business also includes a division called LandAspects, which provides geographic information systems, topographic surveys, web-based applications and compulsory purchase services.

Management consulting

Mouchel's management consultancy business employs more than 300 professional staff who specialise in procurement and project management. This involves technical, financial and commercial advice for all stages of project work. Typical services include PFI advice, due diligence, options appraisal, compliance monitoring, business case preparation, risk management, project definition, facilities management and stakeholder consultation. The sectors it is involved with include defence, law and order, schools, health, waste, social housing, nuclear, roads and rail.

Its size was more than doubled by two acquisitions – project management and organisational change specialist Hornagold and Hills in November 2006, and UK public sector management consulting business Hedra in March 2008.

Property

Mouchel's property business provides procurement, asset management, design maintenance, architectural design, building surveying, project management, and valuation and estate management services. According to New Civil Engineer magazine's Consultants File 2008, Mouchel is the largest provider of facilities management in the UK.

Its key clients are local authorities, with the business being responsible for one of the largest public property portfolios in the UK, including more than 2,200 schools and 4,000 other public buildings.

Regeneration

With UK local government moving towards larger contracts over longer periods of time covering a broad range of activities, Mouchel has established a number of 'strategic partnerships' with the councils of Liverpool, Knowsley, Oldham and Rochdale. These provide a bundle of property and support services to the cities over a number of years.

Waste

Mouchel's waste business provides specialist waste management consultancy services to private and public sector clients in a variety of areas. These include developing and implementing sustainable municipal waste strategies and providing services for all stages of a waste project's lifecycle – from strategy and procurement, through to design, planning, licensing and project management.

Water

Mouchel's water business provides a wide range of water services to public and private companies, both in the UK and overseas. At the end of 2006, following Mouchel's acquisition of Ewan Group, it was the third largest water consultant in the UK behind MWH Europe and Mott MacDonald Group according to New Civil Engineer magazine's Consultants File 2008. It holds more than 40 framework contracts and employs more than 50 people across 16 offices.

Financial performance

Please note office numbers include all Mouchel Limited offices, but not joint venture offices, client offices or offices/sites occupied under local authority contracts.

Mouchel group board 

Haydn Mursell - chief executive (from 2015, as part of Kier Group plc)

Grant Rumbles – chief executive (2011-2015 (until Kier Group acquisition))

Paul Rayner – group finance director (since 2013)

Phil White - chairman (from 2015, as part of Kier Group plc)

Mike Jeffries – chairman (2014-2015 (until Kier Group acquisition))

References

External links

Business services companies of the United Kingdom
Construction and civil engineering companies of the United Kingdom
Engineering companies of the United Kingdom
Business services companies established in 1897
Companies based in Surrey
1897 establishments in England
British companies established in 1897
Construction and civil engineering companies established in 1897